The Polar Bear Family & Me is a three-part nature documentary series produced by the BBC Natural History Unit. It follows wildlife cameraman Gordon Buchanan as he spends a year with a family of wild polar bears, under the guidance of his biologist Jason Roberts, the polar expertise of the Antarctic region and Svalbard near Norwegian archipelago of the Arctic Ocean.

The series was controversial for its use of a perspex box, from within which Buchanan filmed polar bears up close. It was reported that Roberts was notified by Norwegian authorities that he could be fined for "disturbing" the bears.

References

External links
 
 
 The Polar Bear Family and Me on Eden

2013 British television series debuts
2013 British television series endings
2010s British documentary television series
BBC television documentaries
Nature educational television series
Polar bears in popular culture
Television shows set in Antarctica
Television shows set in Norway
English-language television shows